The Kloyosikplem festival is celebrated by the chiefs and peoples of Yilo Krobo (Somanya) in the Eastern region of Ghana. The festival is celebrated in the month of November every year.

References

Festivals in Ghana